Seyyed Kola (also Romanized as Seyyed Kolā and Seyyed Kalā) is a village in Babol Kenar Rural District, Babol Kenar District, Babol County, Mazandaran Province, Iran. At the 2006 census, its population was 865, in 241 families.

References 

Populated places in Babol County